Joker was a British comic strip. It first appeared in Knockout issue 1 (series 2) on 12 June 1971. Knockout merged with Whizzer and Chips in 1973. Joker stayed in Whizzer and Chips as a Whizz-kid until the end, when he continued in Buster until the close of the comic on 4 January 2000. On the "last page" of Buster, Joker reveals that he was Jeremy Beadle all along. The strip was written by Malcolm Morrison, and illustrated by Sid Burgon.

References

British comic strips
Humor comics
British comics characters
Gag-a-day comics
1971 comics debuts
2000 comics endings
Comics characters introduced in 1971
Child characters in comics
Fictional tricksters